Triantafyllia (before 1927: Λάγενη - Lageni, Macedonian: Лаген;  or Лаген) is a village in the municipality of Florina, West Macedonia, Greece.  The population was 81 in 1981 and it grew to 101 by 1991.  The village is set amongst the mountains of Northern Greece, on the slopes of Mount Vernon.  The town has stone architecture.

Demographic history

References

External links
 

Populated places in Florina (regional unit)